John N. Nkengasong is a Cameroonian-American virologist serving as the Global AIDS Coordinator in the Biden administration since 2022. He previously worked as the Director of the Africa Centres for Disease Control and Prevention from 2016 to 2022, as well as at the World Health Organization (WHO) and Centers for Disease Control and Prevention. During the COVID-19 pandemic, Nkengasong was appointed the WHO Special Envoy for Africa.

Early life and education 
Nkengasong is from Cameroon. He became interested in biology, chemistry and mathematics whilst he was at high school.

Nkengasong earned his undergraduate degree at the University of Yaoundé I. During his undergraduate degree he met Peter Piot, who encouraged him to visit Antwerp as a graduate student in virology. He ended up studying biomedical sciences at the Institute of Tropical Medicine Antwerp. After completing his second degree, he moved to the Vrije Universiteit Brussel, where he earned a master's degree in medical sciences.

After earning his master's degree, Nkengasong joined the research group of Guido van der Groen and Piot. His doctoral research was the first to characterise all of the genetic subtypes of HIV in Africa. He later completed a management qualification at the John F. Kennedy School of Government.

Research and career

Early beginnings 
In 1993 Nkengasong joined the World Health Organization, where he served as Chief of Virology. He was based in the Collaborating Centre for HIV/AIDS Diagnostics in the Institute of Tropical Medicine Antwerp. He has worked on the diagnosis, pathogenesis and drug resistance of HIV/AIDS.

US CDC, 1994–2016 
After a couple of years, Nkengasong moved to the United States Centers for Disease Control and Prevention where he worked as Chief of Virology in Abidjan. In preparation for this job he was trained in Berkeley as part of the John E. Fogarty International Center. Nkengasong worked alongside Mike Hendry, who was running the HIV diagnosis programme at the California State Laboratory.

In 2011 Nkengasong helped to establish the African Society for Laboratory Medicine (ASLM). The ASLM looks to support African researchers in developing their laboratory medicine capabilities and ability to care for patients.

Africa CDC, 2016–2022 
In 2016 Nkengasong joined the Africa Centres for Disease Control and Prevention, where he was made the inaugural Director. At the Africa CDC Nkengasong oversees the Regional Integrated Surveillance and Laboratory Networks (RISLNET). He believes that to keep infectious diseases in check in Africa it is essential to empower local leadership.

During the COVID-19 pandemic Nkengasong was appointed a special envoy to the director general of the World Health Organization. In this capacity he was responsible for amplifying the messages of the Director General as well as  providing strategic advice on preparedness. Nkengasong led Africa's response to coronavirus disease, including training a team of young responders; the African Healthcare Volunteer Workforce. Protecting the African population from coronavirus disease is complicated by challenges such as difficulties in testing in regions affected by conflicts and issues with social distancing in urban slums.

In the preparations for the Global Health Summit hosted by the European Commission and the G20 in May 2021, Nkengasong co-chaired the event's High-Level Scientific Panel.

Biden administration
On September 27, 2021, President Joe Biden nominated Nkengasong to be the Ambassador-at-Large for Global Health Diplomacy and
Global AIDS Coordinator in the Department of State. Nkengasong's initial nomination expired at the end of the year and was returned to President Biden on January 3, 2022.

President Biden resent his nomination the following day. The Senate Foreign Relations Committee held hearings on Nkengasong's nomination on March 15, 2022. The committee favorably reported his nomination on May 4, 2022. On May 5, 2022, the United States Senate confirmed his nomination by voice vote. He was sworn in on June 13, 2022.

Other activities 
 Centre for International Health Protection (ZIG), Robert Koch Institute (RKI), Member of the Scientific Advisory Board (since 2020) 
 African Coalition for Epidemic Research, Response and Training (ALERRT), Member of the International Scientific Advisory Board
 Coalition for Epidemic Preparedness Innovations (CEPI), Member of the Board
 International AIDS Vaccine Initiative (IAVI), Member of the Board of Directors
 Nuclear Threat Initiative (NTI), Member of the Bio Advisory Group

Awards and honours 
 US Secretary of Health and Human Services Award for Excellence in Public Health Protection Research
 National Order of the Republic of Côte d'Ivoire
 CDC Foundation William Watson Medal of Excellence
 Virchow Prize for Global Health 2022 under High Patronage of the President of the Federal Republic of Germany

Nkengasong was honored by Ngozi Okonjo-Iweala on TIME Magazine's "2021 TIME100" list of influential global figures, who described him as a "modern-day African hero" for his role in the continent's response to the COVID-19 pandemic.

Select publications

References 

Living people
Year of birth missing (living people)
Centers for Disease Control and Prevention people
World Health Organization officials
United States Ambassadors-at-Large
Cameroonian emigrants to the United States
People from Douala
Biden administration personnel